Ogbe or Ogbeh is a surname and given name. Notable people with the name include:

Ogbe Abraha (born 1948), Eritrean politician
Audu Innocent Ogbeh (born 1947), Nigerian politician
Kenneth Ogbe (born 1994), German basketball player